Bossiaea pulchella is a species of flowering plant in the family Fabaceae and is endemic to the south-west of Western Australia. It is a slender, erect shrub with egg-shaped leaves, and orange-yellow, purplish brown and dark red flowers.

Description
Muelleria 23: |journal=Muelleria |date=2006 |volume=11 |pages=39–43 |url=https://www.biodiversitylibrary.org/item/278250#page/41/mode/1up |access-date=22 August 2021}}</ref>

Taxonomy and namingBossiaea pulchella was first formally described in 1844 by Carl Meissner in Lehmann's Plantae Preissianae from specimens collected on the Darling Scarp in 1839. The specific epithet (pulchella) means "small and beautiful".

Distribution and habitat
This bossiaea usually grows in lateritic soil in woodland in the Avon Wheatbelt, Jarrah Forest and Swan Coastal Plain biogeographic regions of south-western Western Australia.

Conservation statusBossiaea pulchella'' is classified as "not threatened" by the Western Australian Government Department of Parks and Wildlife.

References

pulchella
Mirbelioids
Flora of Western Australia
Plants described in 1844
Taxa named by Carl Meissner